Abry is a French surname.

Abry may refer to:

 Abry Jones (born 1991), American American football player